Wila Qullu (Aymara wila blood, blood-red, qullu mountain, "red mountain", also spelled Wila Kkollu) is a  mountain in the Andes of Bolivia. It is situated in the La Paz Department, José Manuel Pando Province, Catacora Municipality. Wila Qullu lies north of the mountain Apachita, north-east of Chuqiwa Qullu (Chuquivakkollu) and south-east of Laram Q'awa.

References 

Mountains of La Paz Department (Bolivia)